This article is a list of migrant vessel incidents on the Mediterranean Sea. The incidents have been referred to as part of the European migrant crisis.

Prior to 2015 
Around 500 people died during the 2014 Malta migrant shipwreck on 11 September 2014. The eleven survivors included Doaa Al Zamel, whose story is featured in the 2017 book A Hope More Powerful than the Sea.

2015

2015 summary

The number of reported deaths of migrants crossing the Mediterranean towards Italy increased in April 2015; a number of different incidents resulted in the deaths of over 1,000 people (UNHCR recorded 3,771 dead or missing during the course of the year) and led to the staging of rescue operations.

April

13 April 
On 13 April 2015, a vessel sank off the Libyan coast with up to 550 migrants on board. More than 400 people are believed to have drowned. 144–150 people were rescued and were taken to a hospital in Southern Italy.

Air and sea search operations started in the location of the shipwreck, looking for survivors. Nine bodies were recovered; the Italian Coast Guard stated that "no more survivors have been found".

16 April 
On 16 April, four immigrants arriving in Sicily said they were the only survivors of a sunken ship.  They said that 41 people had drowned when their vessel overturned and sank shortly after departing from Libya. In an unrelated incident, 15 people were arrested in Sicily following reports that they had thrown 12 other passengers overboard, causing them to drown.  According to eyewitnesses, a fight had broken out between Christian and Muslim groups on a boat that left Libya on 14 April, resulting in 12 Christians being thrown overboard.

19 April 

On 19 April, another boat that had just left the port city of Zuwarah, Tripoli, capsized off the Libyan coast during the night, with up to 850 migrants aboard. 28 people were rescued. The boat may have capsized when people on board moved to one side when a ship approached. Italian prosecutors say that a Bangladeshi survivor estimated 950 people were on board, and smugglers locked hundreds of the migrants in the ship's hold. Among those on board were about 350 Eritreans, 200 Senegalese, as well as migrants from Syria, Somalia, Sierra Leone, Mali, Gambia, Ivory Coast and Ethiopia.

The Maltese Navy and Italian Coast Guard began mounting a rescue operation. Despite 18 ships joining the rescue effort, only 28 survivors and 24 bodies were pulled from the water by nightfall. This incident is cited by some as the shipwreck with the highest death toll in the history of the Mediterranean. Among other incidents, however, the sinking of the SS Oria in 1944, with a death toll of over 4,000, claimed more lives.

On 21 April Italian officials reported that the Tunisian captain of the boat had been charged with reckless multiple homicide. It was also reported that the children on board had drowned because they were trapped on the boat's lower two levels.

The Italian Navy, at the request of the Prosecutor of Catania, has made available the minesweepers Gaeta and Vieste, along with the corvette Sfinge, for search and localization of the vessel sank.

On 7 May 2015 a wreck of a length of 25 metres was located approximately 85 miles north east of the Libyan coast at a depth of 375 metres. The Italian Navy said it was correlated with the wreck of the vessel sank on 18 April.

20 April 
Another boat carrying migrants reportedly sank off the east coast of Rhodes, Greece on 20 April, after striking a reef. Initial reports suggested that there had been at least three deaths. 93 people were rescued from the water, with 30 individuals hospitalized. In contrast to the other wrecked ships, which have come from Libya, this boat had departed from Turkey.

Two further reports of ships in distress in the waters between Libya and Italy appeared on 20 April. It was stated that one boat contained up to 150 people, with the other containing up to 300. The precise locations of these boats was not revealed, and it was unclear whether these reports refer to separate vessels. The Italian and Maltese navies are reported as having responded to these calls. On Tuesday 21 April it was reported that all 450 passengers had been rescued, despite initial reports of deaths.

May

5 May 
Continue rescue operations and landings of migrants on the coasts of Sicily and Calabria. The ship Phoenix arrives in Pozzallo carrying 369 migrants. Other 675 immigrants have landed in Augusta and in 300 were rescued off the coast of Calabria. On ship container Zeran, arrived in Catania with 197 people, there were five dead bodies. According to Save the Children 40 other immigrants have lost their lives at sea.
In Crotone the Panamanian tanker Prince I brought 250 migrants rescued in the Channel of Sicily, but also the bodies of three others, two women and a man, recovered at sea during a rescue.

Meanwhile, also triggered the alarm diseases: about 150 of the 675 migrants arrived on the ship Vega in Augusta were put in isolation in the port for suspected cases of chickenpox and scabies. For doctors there is no danger of contagion and the situation would be under control. Most patients are tested and debilitated by a wait of two months in warehouses in Libya with little food and water.

In Trapani, 104 immigrants arrived on a cargo ship; another 483 arrived in Palermo on the Italian Navy ship Borsini. This also led to a growth of the number of smugglers arrested by the Italian police forces.

Off the coast of Calabria, a rescue operation at about 300 migrants on board a fishing vessel in poor buoyancy occurred about 80 miles from the coast of Calabria.

29 May 
The Italian Navy rescued 217 migrants who were on board the boats adrift in the channel of Sicily. Also recovered 17 corpses.
In the last 24 hours rescued 3,300 migrants.

July

23 July 
283 migrants aboard three boats were rescued by the German warship Schleswig-Holstein at few miles from the Libyan coast and landed in the port of Augusta in Sicily, while 40 are missing or dead according to the testimonies of survivors.

August

15 August 
49 migrants killed by fumes while packed into hold and prevented from exiting the hold by the ship's crew off the coast of Libya; survivors were rescued by the Italian Navy and the ship's captain and crew were arrested.

18 August 
Six migrants drown off the coast of Turkey attempting to reach a Greek island.

25 August 
50 migrants killed by fumes while packed into the hold and prevented from exiting by the ship's crew off the coast of Libya; survivors were rescued by a Swedish unit. On the boat there traveled another 400 migrants who were rescued.

September 
A further 96 confirmed deaths were recorded in September 2015.

2016

Summary 
According to UNHCR, annual deaths and missing peaked in 2016, at 5,096.

21 September 
On 21 September 2016, a boat capsized off the Egyptian coast with around 600 migrants on board in the Mediterranean Sea. 204 bodies were recovered (including at least 30 children) and around 160 people were rescued, as tens of people remain missing, with approximately 300 people predicted to have died. Four people were arrested for trafficking and breaking capacity laws. The incident may be the worst this year in the Mediterranean Sea.

3 November 
On 3 November, around 240 people died in two migrant boat capsizing incidents off the coast of Libya. 29 people survived the first wreck, with about 120 deaths reported. Only two people survived the second wreck, with again around 120 deaths reported. Another hundred people are believed to have drowned off the coast when their boat sank after they were abandoned off Libya without a motor on 17 November. 27 survivors were transported to Italy. An estimated 4,700 people have died trying to cross the Mediterranean Sea in 2016.

2017

Summary 
According to UNHCR, annual deaths and missing in 2017 stood at 3,139.

2018

Summary 
According to UNHCR, annual deaths and missing in 2018 stood at 2,277.

October 
On 8 October, Italian authorities rescued 22 Europe-bound migrants from a boat carrying around 50 people. At the time of the rescue, the bodies of 13 women were also found, and it was later revealed that others were still missing. On 16 October, Italian authorities found the bodies of at least 12 people who had died in the incident.

November 
In November, Italian coast guards rescued 149 Europe-bound migrants after their boat capsized. Italian coast guards found five dead bodies afterwards and confirmed that the death toll from the incident totalled at least 18.

2019 

According to UNHCR, annual deaths and missing in 2019 stood at 1,510.

2020 

According to UNHCR, annual deaths and missing in 2020 stood at 1,881.

2021 

According to UNHCR, annual deaths and missing in 2021 were estimated at 3,231.

2022 

According to UNHCR, annual deaths and missing in 2022 stood at 1,953.

2023 

On 26 February, over 70 people were killed in the 2023 Calabria migrant boat disaster off the southern coast of Italy.
On 1 March, two people were killed when a boat carrying 30 migrants capsized off the coast of Kos, Greece.
On 9 March, at least 14 people were killed and 54 rescued when their boat trying to reach Europe sank off the coast of Sfax region, Tunisia.

See also 

 European migrant crisis
 May 2007 Malta migrant shipwreck
 2009 Mediterranean Sea migrant shipwreck
 2011 Mediterranean Sea migrant shipwreck
 2013 Lampedusa migrant shipwreck
 2014 Libya migrant shipwreck
 2014 Malta migrant shipwreck
 2018 Libya migrant shipwrecks
 Immigration to Europe
 Immigration to Italy
 Immigration to Greece
 African immigration to Europe
 Lampedusa immigrant reception center
 List of ships for the rescue of refugees in the Mediterranean Sea

References

Further reading
 Panebianco, Stefania. "Human security at the Mediterranean borders: humanitarian discourse in the EU periphery." International Politics (2021): 1-21.
 Cusumano, Eugenio, and Kristof Gombeer. "In deep waters: The legal, humanitarian and political implications of closing Italian ports to migrant rescuers." Mediterranean Politics 25.2 (2020): 245–253. online
 Cusumano, Eugenio. "Humanitarians at sea: Selective emulation across migrant rescue NGOs in the Mediterranean sea." Contemporary security policy 40.2 (2019): 239–262. online

Migrant shipwreck
History of Rhodes
Immigration-related lists
Lampedusa e Linosa
Lists of transport accidents and incidents
Maritime incidents in Greece
Maritime incidents in Italy
Maritime incidents in Libya
Maritime incidents in Malta
Maritime incidents in Turkey
Mediterranean-related lists